Antonin Nechodoma (1877–1928), was a Czech architect who practiced in Puerto Rico and Dominican Republic from 1905 to 1928. He is known for the introduction of the Prairie Style to the Caribbean and the integration of Arts and Crafts elements to his architecture. Nechodoma designed in such style at the historical district of Miramar, Puerto Rico where the town preserves his creation.

Biography
Antonin Nechodoma was born in Prague (then part of Bohemia) in 1877.
In 1887, Nechodoma's family emigrated to Chicago where he worked as a contractor. In 1905, Nechodoma, already an architect, arrived in Puerto Rico after working for a short period in Florida. In Puerto Rico (1905–1928), Nechodoma became one of the most prominent architects in the Caribbean. His work included private and public buildings: banks, schools, markets, churches and houses. His practice extended to the Dominican Republic where he built the main 'glorieta' in the Parque Independencia in Santo Domingo and the Market in San Pedro de Macoris.

Nechodoma's work has been surrounded by controversy. His architectural style varied widely, from Neo-Classical Style for public school buildings, Gothic and Mission Style for his churches and Prairie Style in his houses. The most controversial aspect of Nechodoma's work has been his plagiarism of Frank Lloyd Wright's residential work. Architectural historians Jorge Rigau, Enrique Vivoni Farage, and Nechodoma's biographer, Thomas Marvel have discussed extensively Nechodoma's direct use of Wright's Wasmuth Portfolio as a reference for his residential work in Puerto Rico.

Despite the controversy, Nechodoma made significant contributions to the architecture of Puerto Rico and the Caribbean. His integration of arts and crafts motifs to his architecture, ranging from furniture design, ironwork, stained glass, and mosaics, had an enormous influence in the Caribbean architecture of the early 20th century. His prolific production left a wealth of first class public buildings in both the Dominican Republic and Puerto Rico, notable because of their technical innovations and their contribution toward forming  a language of  tropical architecture in the Caribbean. Nechodoma's work was published extensively during his lifetime. He also published in 1927 an important article on architecture in Puerto Rico entitled "Concerning Architecture in Puerto Rico".

Nechodoma died in a car crash in 1928.

Notable works
Our Lady of Lourdes Chapel (1908) Santurce, Puerto Rico
Missionary Society of the Methodist Episcopal Church (1907) Ponce, Puerto Rico
Casa Korber (1917) Miramar, Puerto Rico
Casa Roig (1919) Humacao, Puerto Rico
Georgetti Mansion (1923) Santurce, Puerto Rico
Casa Dr. Eugenio Fernández Garcia (Same period) Miramar, Puerto Rico
Baluarte del Conde, redesigned in 1912, Santo Domingo, Dominican Republic
Roman Catholic Diocese of San Pedro de Macorís, In 1902 started with plans and execution of prominent French engineer Monsieur Eduardo Garcia. In 1910 was initiated by the Engineer Nechodoma, after the death of French Eduardo Garcia, changing the original plans to make it in concrete and masonry not as first thought.
McCabe Memorial Church (1908), Ponce, Puerto Rico

Antonin Nechodoma's Papers
The Architecture and Construction Archives at the University of Puerto Rico (AACUPR) holds the Antonin Nechodoma Collection (1906-1992).  Approximately four cubic feet in size, the collection contains architectural drawings, photographs, artifacts, and textual documents. The Architectural Drawings Series holds 20 projects organized chronologically. The documents were transferred to the School of Architecture’s Library in 1986.

Gallery

References

External links

The Antonin Nechodoma Collection electronic finding aid may be consulted through www.hip.upr.edu

Miramar (Santurce)
1877 births
1928 deaths
Puerto Rican architects
Czech architects
People from the Kingdom of Bohemia
Road incident deaths in Puerto Rico
Prairie School architecture
Arts and Crafts movement
Ponce Creole architects
Austro-Hungarian emigrants to the United States